This is a list of electoral results for the electoral district of Nerang in Queensland state elections.

Members for Nerang

Election results

Elections in the 1990s

Elections in the 1980s

References

Queensland state electoral results by district